Major General Matthew John Holmes,  (29 June 1967 – 2 October 2021) was a British senior Royal Marines officer who served for more than three decades in the armed forces. After studying economics at the University of Exeter, he joined the Royal Marines and undertook early tours of duty to Norway, the Far East, Northern Ireland and Zimbabwe. After being deployed to Kosovo and Afghanistan, he commanded 42 Commando Royal Marines from 2006 to 2008 and was awarded a Distinguished Service Order for his leadership in Afghanistan. Holmes served as Commandant General Royal Marines from 2019 to 2021.

Early life and education
Holmes was born on 29 June 1967 in Chalfont St Giles, Buckinghamshire, England, to Christopher Holmes and Linda Holmes. He was educated at Desborough School, a comprehensive school in Maidenhead, Berkshire. He studied at the University of Exeter (BA, Economics) and King's College London (MA Defence Studies).

Military career
Holmes was commissioned into the Royal Marines in 1988. He first served with 42 Commando then trained in Norway with 40 Commando, before being deployed to West Belfast in 1993–94 as part of on Operation Banner during The Troubles. He was deployed to Zimbabwe then Brunei with 45 Commando before redeploying to Northern Ireland, this time to South Armagh in command of a company of 42 Commando.

Promoted to major, Holmes graduated from Staff College, receiving his Master of Arts in Defence Studies in 2000. As operations officer of 3 Commando Brigade, he deployed to Operation Agricola IV (Kosovo), as part of Kosovo Force, from August 2000 to February 2001. Following that, Holmes joined coalition forces in Afghanistan for Operation Jacana from March to July 2002. On his return he was promoted to lieutenant colonel then moved to the Permanent Joint Headquarters as an operations team leader; in that function he supervised Operation Coral in the Congo, a French-led multinational peacekeeping mission during the Second Congo War in 2003, followed by the deployment of the Spearhead Battalion to Kosovo upon NATO emergency request in March 2004. Holmes later deployed to Iraq in the headquarters of the Multi-National Division (South East) in Basra during Operation Telic.

Holmes became commanding officer of 42 Commando Battle Group on 27 March 2006 and deployed to Afghanistan with his unit on Operation Herrick V, in support of NATO multinational operations in Helmand Province with the backing of Afghan government, from September 2006. For his leadership in Afghanistan, he was awarded the Distinguished Service Order in July 2007, while under his command 42 Commando was awarded one Conspicuous Gallantry Cross, seven Military Crosses and seven Mentions in Despatches. In December 2009 he served as military assistant to the Vice-Chief of the Defence Staff, the deputy to the professional head of the British Armed Forces, during the 2010 Strategic Defence and Security Review, a major review of UK defence strategy. Holmes completed the postgraduate Higher Command and Staff Course in 2012 at the Defence Academy in Shrivenham.

After being promoted to brigadier on 19 March 2013, Holmes became Head of Future and Maritime teams at the Development, Concepts and Doctrine Centre, the Ministry of Defence's think tank. Following the 2015–16 UK floods, Holmes was asked to conduct a review of national flood preparedness and response at behest of "Flood Minister" Rory Stewart. In April 2016 he was selected as the first chief of staff of Standing Joint Force Headquarters, a high-readiness expeditionary command and control headquarters based in Northwood, which he oversaw from establishment to full operating capacity in just two years. On 9 May 2018 he was promoted to major general and appointed director of the Resolute Support Mission Ministerial Advisory Group in Afghanistan. He was then Deputy Adviser to Afghanistan's Ministry of Interior in Kabul, then Senior British Military Representative in Afghanistan from November of the same year. He returned to the UK in May 2019.

Holmes was appointed Commandant General Royal Marines on 14 June 2019, taking over from Major General Charles Stickland. In that role, and in the context of the Integrated Review, Holmes oversaw the implementation of the Future Commando Force, the modernisation project of the Royal Marines; as a component of the programme the Vanguard Strike Company was formed in July 2020. Having served only 22 months of the three-year appointment, he was removed from the post on 30 April 2021 due to restructuring of the role into a three-star appointment. He was succeeded as Commandant General by Lieutenant General Robert Magowan.

Holmes was appointed a Commander of the Order of the British Empire as part of the 2019 Birthday Honours for his "outstanding contribution to the Royal Marines and to the United Kingdom's defence and security interests". Holmes was awarded the United States Legion of Merit "for his outstanding service" in Afghanistan as military commander and as deputy adviser to the Afghanistan Ministry of Interior Affairs. Holmes was a pallbearer at the funeral of Prince Philip, Duke of Edinburgh in April 2021, during the procession to the steps of St George's Chapel, Windsor Castle.

Death and funeral
Holmes died on 2 October 2021 at his home in Winchester, aged 54. A coroner's inquest heard that Holmes' death was as a result of hanging. The inquest also heard how firearms officers from Hampshire Constabulary attended an incident at Holmes' home address on 22 September 2021 in response to a welfare call. This resulted in the seizure of a licensed firearm.

Holmes' funeral took place on 13 October 2021 at Winchester Cathedral. Prior to the funeral, Lieutenant General Robert Magowan sent a letter to retired commanders, appealing for calm following disputes between the Marines and the Royal Navy. In addition to Holmes' widow and two children, more than 700 people attended the funeral, including the Defence Secretary, Ben Wallace, the outgoing Chief of the Defence Staff, General Sir Nick Carter, his replacement, Admiral Sir Tony Radakin, and Rear Admiral Mike Utley, Commander of the UK's Strike Force. Every unit of the Royal Marines was represented, including 42 Commando. Flag bearers from the Royal Marines Association and the United States Marine Corps, lined the approach to the cathedral as the hearse carrying the coffin approached. Holmes' coffin, draped in the Union flag with his Royal Marines cap resting on top, was carried into the cathedral by the same pallbearers who had officiated with him at the Duke of Edinburgh's funeral. The Royal Marines Band Service performed the music ending with the Last Post and God Save the Queen. As the ceremony ended a Three-volley salute was fired by Marines from the Commando Training Centre Royal Marines.

References

Sources

 
 
 
 
 
 
 
 
 
 
 
 
 
 
 
 
 
 
 

1967 births
2021 deaths
Alumni of the University of Exeter
Alumni of King's College London
Commanders of the Order of the British Empire
Companions of the Distinguished Service Order
Royal Marines generals
British military personnel of The Troubles (Northern Ireland)
Royal Navy personnel of the Iraq War
Royal Navy personnel of the War in Afghanistan (2001–2021)
20th-century Royal Marines personnel
21st-century Royal Marines personnel
Suicides by hanging in England
Military personnel from Buckinghamshire